Serghei Alexeev (born 31 May 1986) is a Moldovan footballer who plays as a forward. He also holds Russian citizenship as Sergei Viktorovich Alekseyev.

Career
On 3 March 2009, Norwegian champions Stabæk announced that Alexeev would attend a week-long trial with the club.

On 25 June 2009 he signed with Swiss team FC Aarau on a three-year contract. He signed at Kaposvári Rákóczi FC in summer 2011. During the 2012–13 season, he was released from Kaposvári Rákóczi FC and signed with Yenisey.

On 31 January 2012, he signed at Maccabi Netanya.

International
Alexeev has played 25 times for Moldova, scoring five goals.

International goals
Scores and results list Moldova's goal tally first.

Career statistics

Club

Honours
Sheriff Tiraspol
Divizia Naţională: 2006/07, 2007/08
Cupa Moldovei: 2007–08
Moldovan Supercup: 2004, 2007
CIS Cup: 2009

References

External links
 
 Serghei Alexeev player info at the official FC Sheriff website 
 Swiss Super League profile 
 
 
 

1986 births
Living people
People from Tiraspol
Moldovan footballers
Association football forwards
Moldova international footballers
Moldovan expatriate footballers
FC Sheriff Tiraspol players
FC Tiraspol players
FC Iskra-Stal players
FC Aarau players
FC Hoverla Uzhhorod players
Kaposvári Rákóczi FC players
Maccabi Netanya F.C. players
FC Yenisey Krasnoyarsk players
FC Veris Chișinău players
FC Zimbru Chișinău players
FC SKA-Khabarovsk players
FC Dinamo-Auto Tiraspol players
BFC Daugavpils players
FC Sfîntul Gheorghe players
CSF Bălți players
CS Petrocub Hîncești players
Moldovan Super Liga players
Swiss Super League players
Ukrainian Premier League players
Ukrainian First League players
Nemzeti Bajnokság I players
Israeli Premier League players
Russian First League players
Latvian Higher League players
Expatriate footballers in Switzerland
Moldovan expatriate sportspeople in Switzerland
Expatriate footballers in Ukraine
Moldovan expatriate sportspeople in Ukraine
Expatriate footballers in Hungary
Moldovan expatriate sportspeople in Hungary
Expatriate footballers in Israel
Moldovan expatriate sportspeople in Israel
Expatriate footballers in Russia
Moldovan expatriate sportspeople in Russia
Expatriate footballers in Latvia
Moldovan expatriate sportspeople in Latvia